PBS Kids (styled as PBS KIDS) is the brand for most of the children's programming aired by the Public Broadcasting Service (PBS) in the United States. Some public television children's programs are not produced by PBS member stations or transmitted by PBS. Instead, they are produced by independent public television distributors such as American Public Television, and are not labeled as "PBS Kids" programming, as it is mainly a programming block branding. The target audience is children between the ages of 2 and 8. The network is also available in sub-Saharan Africa and Australia.

History

PTV block
PBS had historically aired programs for children such as Sesame Street, Mister Rogers' Neighborhood, and Reading Rainbow; prior to 1993, these programs aired under general PBS branding. In August 1993, PBS introduced new branding for their children's programs featuring "The P-Pals", animated characters shaped like PBS logos who encouraged skills such as gathering information, self-esteem, cooperation and achieving goals in specially developed interstitials.

The framework for PBS Kids was established as part of PBS' "Ready to Learn" initiative, a project intended to facilitate access of early childhood educational programming to underprivileged children. On July 11, 1994, PBS repackaged their existing children's educational programming as a new block called "PTV", airing on 11 member stations at launch.  In addition to scheduled educational programming, PTV also incorporated interstitial content with the P-Pals in their fictional world "PTV Park" for younger children. Older children were targeted with live-action and music video interstitials.

Apple Computer provided a $1.5 million grant to PTV and became its first national underwriter on June 26, 1995, as part of their "Bring Learning Home" corporate initiative. A "Ready To Learn" grant unveiled on January 8, 1996, supported the development of Dragon Tales and Between the Lions, which premiered in 1999 and 2000, respectively, as well as their online activities and outreach efforts. By September 1996, 95 PBS stations reaching three quarters of the United States were carrying the PTV service. Starting on October 7, 1996, PBS packaged their programs for school-aged children into the block The Game, airing on 31 stations by the end of the year.

PBS announced on January 18, 1999, that it would launch the PBS Kids Channel, meant to be the centerpiece of a larger initiative, in September. On June 9, PBS revealed a wide rebranding of its children's programs and services, known as PBS Kids, at its annual meeting in San Francisco. PBS would also increase its children's programming budget by 25% and commit to two new series: Caillou and Anne of Green Gables: The Animated Series.

PBS Kids
On September 6, 1999, PBS launched the 24-hour PBS Kids television network. The separate network (referred to as the PBS Kids Channel in press materials) was available on high-tier subscription providers, and was also offered to PBS member stations for use on a "cablecast" service (a subscription-based local channel provided by the member station) or for use on the member station's free-to-air analog channel to provide a portion of the daytime PBS Kids programming on the station. Participating stations were required to pay an annual fee of $1,000 to use the feed. At launch, 32 PBS member stations had signed up to use the service. The channel was partly created to compete against the Nick Jr. block and its sister network Noggin; at the time, Noggin was co-owned by the Children's Television Workshop (the production company behind Sesame Street) and Nickelodeon. Because the pay-TV rights to the Children's Television Workshop's programs were owned by Noggin, the channel did not broadcast CTW programming, including longtime PBS staple Sesame Street, though an exception was made with Dragon Tales (which premiered on the same day as the launch of the PBS Kids Channel).

The new PBS Kids branding elements began rolling out on PBS stations in October; PBS provided grants to stations who adopted the new branding early. The PBS Kids website was relaunched with some new areas on February 1, 2000.

The channel was unsuccessful and had only reached 9 million households as of 2002, compared to Noggin's 23.3 million households at the time. The PBS Kids network was shut down on September 26, 2005, in favor of a new commercial cable and satellite joint venture channel, PBS Kids Sprout, which was developed in partnership with Sesame Workshop, HIT Entertainment and Comcast (who later bought full control of the network via NBCUniversal).

PBS later revived the PBS Kids Channel on January 16, 2017, this time being structured as a multi-platform service with an online streaming option in addition to utilizing largely the same distribution methods that had been used for the original channel.

In June 2022, it was announced that PBS Kids would inaugurate a new, text-only logo set upon a disc element, on July 19, 2022.

Block and local channels

PBS gave licensees an option to sign on Sprout promoters while indicating that they should retain PBS Kids programming block during the day time. Half of stations programmed their own children's channel. PBS offered a replacement early school-aged kids network based on the block PBS Kids Go! by April 2006 to be launched in October 2006, but was cancelled before launch.

On May 8, 2013, PBS Kids programming was added to the Roku streaming player.

Amid research which revealed that the PBS Kids brand was more recognizable than PBS Kids Go!, and ratings which showed preschoolers and school-age children watching each other's shows, PBS Kids received another graphic redesign and the PBS Kids Go! branding was dissolved on October 7, 2013, coinciding with the debut of Peg + Cat.
On July 1, 2016, Amazon Prime Video and PBS Distribution entered into a multi-year agreement which saw several PBS Kids series on other streaming services move to Amazon Prime Video.

PBS Kids network was relaunched on January 16, 2017, with a live stream of the channel on the PBS Kids website and video app; no changes were made to the main PBS Kids block. The block is counter programmed from the network, thus the same show would not be shown at the same time on the network and block. PBS Kids Channel is also available on DirecTV and DirecTV Stream on channel 288.

International distribution
PBS Distribution partnered with MultiChoice to launch PBS Kids on May 22, 2019 on DStv and GOtv platforms across its Sub-Saharan Africa footprint.

In the summer of 2021, PBS Distribution partnered with Foxtel to launch PBS Kids in Australia.

Programming
For list of all PBS Kids programs, see List of programs broadcast by PBS Kids.

Programming blocks

Current
 PBS Kids Family Night (April 21, 2017 – present) – an evening programming block airing encores of PBS Kids movies and specials, typically from 7 to 9 pm on Fridays, Saturdays, and Sundays. Exclusive to the PBS Kids 24/7 channel.

Former

 The Game (October 7, 1996 – September 6, 1999) – an afternoon programming block aimed at children ages 6 to 8. Aired on PTV.
 PBS Kids Bookworm Bunch (September 30, 2000 – September 5, 2004) – a Saturday morning block consisting of six animated series produced by the Canadian animation studio,           Nelvana Limited.
 PBS Kids Go! (October 11, 2004 – October 7, 2013) – an afternoon programming block aimed at children ages 6 to 8.
 PBS Kids Preschool Block (September 4, 2006 – October 7, 2013) – a morning programming block aimed at preschoolers.

Critical reception 
PBS Kids programming has historically received generally positive reviews from television critics and parents of young children. L.A. Story (a division of Blogspot) wrote, "Great for any little explorer!" Rob Owen of Pittsburgh Post-Gazette wrote, "Best children's entertainment available." Valerie Williams of Scary Mommy wrote, "A wonderful gift." Steve Aquino of Forbes wrote, "Making learning accessible in the coronavirus age."

Network

PBS Kids is an American digital broadcast and online television network operated by the Public Broadcasting Service. The network features a broad mix of live action and animated children's programs distributed to PBS by independent companies and select member stations, which are designed for improving the early literacy, math, and social-emotional skills of young children ages 3 to 9. Some PBS member stations, such as KLCS in Los Angeles maintain their own locally programmed PBS Kids feed, that is independent from the nationally sourced feed.

Network history
On September 6, 1999, PBS launched the PBS Kids Channel in several markets, in conjunction with the introduction of the PBS Kids brand to provide a unified branding for the service's children's programming offerings. The channel was launched on 33 PBS member stations: 19 of which offered PBS Kids Channel as a cable-only service, 9 which carried the channel on their digital broadcast signals in standard-definition, and 3 which carried simulcasts of the channel on their analog signals. Of the initial 27 affiliates, 16 of them planned to begin carrying PBS Kids Channel during the fall of 1999, with 11 additional stations choosing to debut it that winter.

FCC requirements mandated satellite providers to set aside 4% of their available channel space for noncommercial educational and informational programming. With these providers limited to offering one such service per programmer, PBS had put forth PBS Kids as a prospective channel to fulfill this mandate.

In the aftermath of DirecTV's decision not to renew its funding agreement with the channel, which ended in the third quarter of 2005, PBS decided to shut down the network on September 26 of that year. PBS Kids Channel was effectively supplanted on that date by PBS Kids Sprout, an advertiser-supported cable and satellite channel that PBS developed in a joint venture with HIT Entertainment, Sesame Workshop, and Comcast. PBS gave licensees an option to sign on Sprout promoters, giving them cross-promotional and monetary benefits in exchange for giving up the ability to carry a competing preschool-targeted channel. 80 stations, making up about half of the member stations participants, signed up to be promoters; most of the remaining stations opted to develop independent children's programming services featuring programs distributed by PBS and through outside distributors such as American Public Television to fill space on digital subchannels that formerly served as PBS Kids Channel members. Many of the member stations that launched children's-focused subchannel or cable-only services reduced the amount of sourced programming from PBS Kids carried on their primary channel to a few hours of their weekday daytime schedules, in order to program more adult-targeted fare during the afternoon.

PBS relaunched the PBS Kids network on January 16, 2017. Structured as a multi-platform service, it was made available for distribution to digital subchannels of participating PBS member stations, initially launching on 73 member stations (counting those operated as subregional PBS member networks), with an additional 34 agreeing to begin carrying the network at a later date. A live stream of the channel was also added to the PBS Kids website and video app upon the channel's debut, which will eventually allow viewers to toggle from the program being aired to a related educational game extending the interactivity introduced by Sesame Street. The network is counterprogrammed from the PBS Kids block, so that the same program would not be shown on either simultaneously. PBS Kids 24/7 mainly features double-runs of existing series on PBS Kids' schedule (including some not carried on the primary channels of certain member stations); as such, no additional programs had to be acquired to help fill the channel's schedule. On April 21, 2017, the network launched "PBS Kids Family Night," a weekly block on Friday evenings (with encore airings on Saturday and Sunday evenings) that showcase themed programming, premieres or special "movie-length" episodes of new and existing PBS Kids children's programs.

In November 2020, PBS Kids, in association with the main PBS service, became the terrestrial television home of select specials from the Peanuts animated library, under a sub-licensing agreement with Apple TV+.

Affiliates

References

External links
 

1999 establishments in the United States
American children's websites
Children's television networks in the United States
 
Preschool education television networks
Public Broadcasting Service
Television channels and stations established in 1999
Television programming blocks in the United States
Television networks in the United States
American brands